Paul Joseph Dresher (born January 8, 1951 in Los Angeles) is an American composer. Dresher received his B.A. in music from the University of California, Berkeley and his M.A. in composition from the University of California, San Diego, where he studied with Robert Erickson, Roger Reynolds, Pauline Oliveros, and Bernard Rands.

He also studied Ghanaian drumming with C. K. and Kobla Ladzekpo, Hindustani classical music with Nikhil Banerjee, and Balinese and Javanese music.

Dresher's music has been variously described as minimalist and postminimalist. Dresher himself, poking fun at the latter term (which he perceives as fairly meaningless), has referred to himself as a "pre-maximalist," hence the name of his record label, MinMax.

Dresher served on the Board of Directors for the American Music Center from 1994 through 2000.

Recordings of Dresher's works are available on the Lovely Music, New World, CRI, Music and Arts, O.O. Discs, BMG/Catalyst, MinMax, Starkland, and New Albion labels.

He was the recipient of a 2006 Guggenheim fellowship.

With his Paul Dresher Ensemble, Dresher plays such newly built instruments as the Quadrachord (2000) and Hurdy Grande (2008).

References

External links 
Paul Dresher biography from The Paul Dresher Ensemble site
The Paul Dresher Ensemble
Casa Vecchia CD from Starkland
Slow Fire CD
surround sound DVD
Golden, Barbara. “Conversation with Paul Dresher.” eContact! 12.2 — Interviews (2) (April 2010). Montréal: CEC.

1951 births
Living people
20th-century classical composers
20th-century American composers
20th-century American male musicians
21st-century classical composers
21st-century American composers
21st-century American male musicians
American classical composers
American male classical composers
Gamelan musicians
University of California, San Diego alumni
University of California, Berkeley alumni
Pupils of Robert Erickson
Pupils of Roger Reynolds
Pupils of Pauline Oliveros
Jewish American classical composers